("carp bread") is a fish-shaped pastry stuffed with sweetened red bean paste, which originated from the Japanese taiyaki. One of South Korea's most popular winter street foods, the snack is often sold at street stalls, grilled on an appliance similar to a waffle iron but with a fish-shaped mold. Red bean paste is the standard filling but many  sold as street food are filled with pastry cream (called "choux-cream" in South Korea), pizza toppings, chocolate and others. Usually, it costs about 1,000 won (KRW) for three . However, small  costs 1,000 won for five and large  costs 2,000 won for one, indicating that the price range varies depending on the size.

Etymology 
The word  is a compound of "carp" and "bread". The pastry, however, contains no ingredients from its namesake fish or any other fish; rather the name comes from the shape of the pastry.

History 
 was derived from the Japanese treat,  (baked sea bream), introduced to Korea around the 1930s when the country was under Japanese rule. According to the 2011 book Bungeoppang Has a Family Tree,  began as a mix of Western waffles and Eastern dumplings, as the  itself was a Japanese adaptation of Western waffles introduced to Japan in the 18th century. The change of fish-shaped pastry continued, as the sea bream-shaped  became carp-shaped  in Korea. Although 's popularity did not last long, it found its way back into popularity during the 1990s with the retro craze in South Korea.

Recently,  has been seeing higher demand, so to provide information on remaining stalls, enthusiasts nationwide created a " map." Through Google Maps, users mark the stalls' locations with brief reviews, prices and opening hours to share with others.

Preparation 
 batter is made of wheat flour, baking powder, water and/or milk, and optionally eggs. The batter is poured into a fish-shaped mold in the  grill, an appliance similar to a waffle iron. Sweetened red bean paste with bits of broken beans and bean husk is added, and then more batter is poured to encase the paste. The mold is then closed to grill the pastry until it is golden and crispy.

Gallery

See also 

 
 
 
 List of Korean desserts
 Street food in South Korea

References 

Korean snack food
Street food in South Korea